Liaquatabad, also known as Laloo Khait or Lalukhet ), is a neighborhood in Liaquatabad Town, within Karachi, Sindh, Pakistan. Liaquatabad was named after Nawabzada Liaquat Ali Khan, the first Prime Minister of Pakistan. 

Liaquatabad is a densely populated area surrounded by several commercial zones. Its markets are known for a range of products including furniture, clothing, shoes and jewellery.

History
Liaquatabad, formerly known as Lalukhet because it was once the agricultural land along the Lyari River belonging to a man named Lalu. The land was purchased by Pakistan Public Works Department from Lalu to settle the Urdu speaking Muslim from India at the time of partition. The Government planned an orderly settlement but the Muslim refugees started haphazard and arbitrary construction after delays.

Demographics
There are several ethnic groups in Liaquatabad including Muhajirs, Sindhis, Kashmiris, Seraikis, Pakhtuns, Balochis, Memons, Bohras and Ismailis. The population of Liaquatabad Town is estimated to be nearly half a million people according to the 1998 census. Muhajirs constitute the overwhelming majority of the population of Liaquatabad. Liaquatabad is located in the centre of Karachi.

References

External links 
 Karachi Website.

Neighbourhoods of Karachi
Liaquatabad Town